Canthon indigaceus is a species of dung beetle in the family Scarabaeidae.

The IUCN conservation status of Canthon indigaceus is "LC", least concern, with no immediate threat to the species' survival.

Subspecies
These three subspecies belong to the species Canthon indigaceus:
 Canthon indigaceus chevrolati Harold, 1868 c g
 Canthon indigaceus chiapas Robinson, 1948 c g
 Canthon indigaceus indigaceus g
Data sources: i = ITIS, c = Catalogue of Life, g = GBIF, b = Bugguide.net

References

Further reading

 

Deltochilini
Articles created by Qbugbot
Beetles described in 1866